Rainer Nicot (born 6 June 1954) is a retired German football player. He spent five seasons in the Bundesliga with 1. FC Köln, and overall ten years in the club system, including the reserves.

Honours
1. FC Köln
 Bundesliga: 1977–78
 DFB-Pokal: 1976–77, 1977–78

References

External links
 

1954 births
Living people
German footballers
Bundesliga players
1. FC Köln players
Association football defenders